The Torey Lakes are a pair of soda lakes, Barun-Torey and Zun-Torey, in Russia's Zabaykalsky Krai, on the border with Mongolia (Coordinates 50°04'N, 115°31'E).

Geography and hydrography
The lakes lie close to one another and are connected by a channel. They are in a closed basin with no outlet to the sea. The size and volume of water in the lakes varies with the region's multi-decadal rainfall and climate cycles.

Barun-Torey
During high-water years, Lake Barun-Torey has an area of 550 km², with a volume of 1.4 km3. The average depth is 2.5 m, and the maximum depth is 4.3 m. In low-water years the lake shrinks dramatically, and can dry up completely. The southern end of the lake extends into Mongolia. 

Lake Barun-Torey is fed by two rivers. The Ulz or Uldza River (Uldza-Gol) flows into the lake from the south and forms a large estuary. The Imalka River flows into the lake from the west.

Zun-Torey
Lake Zun-Torey lies east of Lake Barun-Torey. During high water, the lake has a surface area of 285 km2 and the volume is 1.6 km3. The average depth is 4.5 m, and the maximum depth is 6.5 m. The greatest depth is in the northern part of the lake, where the lake bed drops steeply from the shore. The lake is round and has a single island, which turns into a peninsula when the water level is low. Lake Zun-Torey is mostly fed by the channel from Lake Baran-Torey, and does not dry as extensively or vary in extent as much as Lake Baran-Torey does.

Ecology
The lakes and their environs are home to 305 bird species (include 90 breeding species), 42 species of mammals, various reptile, amphibian, and fish species, and over 590 insect species.

The lakes and surrounding wetlands are an important breeding, feeding and staging area for many species of migratory waterbirds, including several rare and threatened species. The lakes support significant breeding populations of several threatened bird species, including the red-crowned crane (Grus japonensis), white-naped crane (Grus vipio), swan goose (Anser cygnoides), great bustard (Otis tarda), and relict gull (Ichthyaetus relictus). The lakes are located on East Asian–Australasian Flyway, and millions of birds pass through the Torey Lakes and nearby wetlands in spring and autumn. The lakes provide migratory habitat for the critically endangered Siberian crane (Grus leucogeranus) and threatened hooded crane (Grus monacha).

Traditional agriculture, fishing, and animal husbandry are important to the local population.

Protected areas
An area of 172,500 ha, including both lakes and adjacent wetlands and uplands, was designated a Ramsar Site on 13 September 1994. The Daursky or Zapovednik-Daursky state biosphere reserve was designated a UNESCO Biosphere Reserve in 1997, and covers an area of 2277 km2.

Threat
A 2020 satellite imagery showed Mongolian plans to build a dam on Uldza River which can potentially disrupt the natural water cycle and harm the fine balance in the ecosystem. UNESCO World Heritage Committee has expressed its concern on the unannounced construction.

References

Lakes of Zabaykalsky Krai
Ramsar sites in Russia
Important Bird Areas of Russia
Mongolia–Russia border